The West Sussex Fire and Rescue Service is the statutory fire and rescue service for the administrative county of West Sussex, England. It is part of West Sussex County Council. ,  the county has 25 fire stations.

Performance
In 2018/2019, every fire and rescue service in England and Wales was subjected to a statutory inspection by Her Majesty's Inspectorate of Constabulary and Fire & Rescue Services (HIMCFRS). The inspection investigated how well the service performs in each of three areas. On a scale of outstanding, good, requires improvement and inadequate, West Sussex Fire and Rescue Service was rated as follows:

Fire stations
The service has 25 fire stations, which are operated according to the following crewing systems:
Wholetime – full-time firefighters are at the station 24/7 and run on watches which change every 12 hours
Retained – on-call retained firefighters are called to the station via pagers. Therefore, they are not always on station
Day-crewed – full-time firefighters are in the station during the day but not the night

See also
 Fire service in the United Kingdom
 List of British firefighters killed in the line of duty

Other West Sussex emergency services
 Sussex Police
 South East Coast Ambulance Service

References

External links

 
West Sussex Fire and Rescue Service at HMICFRS

Fire and rescue services of England
Fire